Sarada Ramudu is a 1980 Indian Telugu-language comedy drama film directed by K. Vasu. The film stars N. T. Rama Rao and Jayasudha with music composed by Chakravarthy. It is a remake of the Hindi film Junglee (1961). The film was a box-office bomb.

Plot 
Madhav is a millionaire who has grown up abroad since childhood. His mother Suvarchala Devi raised him away in very disciplined and stubborn atmosphere, that's why he doesn't know even how to laugh. Madhav completes his education and comes back to run his business. Knowing about his arrival, Madhav's maternal uncle Chidanandam and his son Sadanandam plan to kill him to grab the property, but fail. Madhav safely returns, hands over his responsibilities and removes all official powers of Chidanandam. In the office, also Madhav strictly follows rules and regulations and everyone is frightened about his behaviour. Madhav's younger sister Padma falls in love with Gopi, son of their Manager Sathabhisham and she becomes pregnant. At the same time, Madhav discovers that Chidanandam has committed much fraud in their Kashmir branch and when he is about to leave, he discovers Padma's condition. He hides it from his mother, he takes Padma along with him and secretly performs her marriage with Gopi. At Kashmir, he meets the charming girl Latha daughter of Dr. Prabhakar, in her acquaintance, he understands the beauty of life and becomes a carefree man. Madhav collects all the details against Chidanandam, so, Chidanandam again tries to kill him through Manager Raju, but he safeguards himself. He removes Raju from the job and makes Gopi the new manager. Meanwhile, Padma gives birth to a son, they return, keeping the baby with father. Suvarchala Devi gets shocked by seeing the carefree and changed Madhav. In the office also he creates friendly atmosphere and develops intimacy with employees. After that, Chidanandam reveals to Suvrchala Devi that Padma secretly married Gopi and they also have a son. In the beginning, she is against the marriage. But after Madhav convinces her, she too realises that real value of people lies in their hearts, and she accepts Gopi as his son-in-law. Madhav even tells her about his love, Latha and her father visit to fix the alliance, when Prabhakar is accused as Madhav's father Raja Rao's murderer. Here Prabhakar briefs Madhav that he is innocent; the real culprit is Chidanandam. Furious, Madhav moves to attack Chidanandam. Knowing this, Chidanandam and Sadanandam kidnap Padma's baby. Madhav, in disguise, sees their end. Finally, the movie ends on a happy note with the marriage of Madhav and Latha.

Cast

Soundtrack 

Music composed by Chakravarthy. Lyrics were written by Veturi.

Reception 
Mallik of Sitara Weekly criticised the film, stating this is yet another film made with a concept of bad characters strategising to take control of the assets of the rich family. He criticised the characters and music, but appreciated the photography.

References

External links 
 

1980 comedy-drama films
1980 films
1980s Telugu-language films
Films scored by K. Chakravarthy
Indian comedy-drama films
Telugu remakes of Hindi films